Arnold Burying Ground (also known as the Governor Arnold Burying Ground) is a historic cemetery on Pelham Street just east of Spring Street in Newport, Rhode Island.  It is the burial place of Benedict Arnold, Rhode Island's first governor under the Royal Charter of 1663.

History and description

The cemetery was established in 1677 as the burying ground for the family of Governor Arnold, who immigrated to Rhode Island from England in 1635 with his father William Arnold. The Governor, his wife, and many of his family are buried here.  For many years, the cemetery was buried under a garden in the back yard of a residence, but a major renovation began in 1949 in which all the stones were unearthed, cleaned, and returned to their original positions. There is no inscription on the slabs covering the graves of the governor and his wife, but his grave is marked with a medallion. The cemetery is currently owned and maintained by the Preservation Society of Newport County.

Images

References

External links

Brief Video of Burial Ground

1677 establishments in Rhode Island
Cemeteries in Rhode Island
Newport, Rhode Island